Henry Martínez may refer to: 
Henry Martínez (boxer) (born 1971), boxer from El Salvador
Henry Martinez (fighter) (born 1983), American mixed martial artist
Henry Martínez (songwriter) (born 1950), Venezuelan musician and composer